Pádraig Horan (born 21 April 1950) is an Irish former hurler who played as a full-forward for the Offaly senior hurling team.

Horan made his first appearance for the team during the 1968–69 National League and subsequently became a regular member of the starting fifteen until his retirement after the 1986 championship. During that time he won two All-Ireland medals, four Leinster medals and one All Stars Award. Horan captained Offaly to their first All-Ireland title in 1981. In 2017, he was inducted to the GAA Hall of Fame.

At club level Horan is a three-time Leinster medalist with St Rynagh's. In addition to this he has also won eleven county club championship medals.

In retirement from playing Horan became involved in team management and coaching. At senior inter-county level, he managed Offaly to their first, and only, [National Hurling League] success in 1991. At club level he has managed his own club St. Rynagh's, as well as leading Birr to winning their first All-Ireland Senior Club Hurling Championship in 1995. Horan has also managed the Laois senior inter-county team.

Horan's sons, Cathal and Diarmuid, also played hurling with Offaly.

Playing career

Club
Horan experienced much success with St Rynagh's in a club career that spanned three decades.

In 1968 he was just out of the minor grade when he won his first championship medal in the senior grade. A 1–12 to 3–4 defeat of Coolderry was the first of three championship titles in succession for St Rynagh's. In 1970 Horan added a Leinster medal to his collection following a 4–10 to 2–9 defeat of Rathnure. St Rynagh's later faced Roscrea in the inaugural All-Ireland final, however, Horan's side were defeated by 4–5 to 2–5.

Four county championships-in-a-row proved beyond St Rynagh's, however, the club bounced back in 1972. A defeat of Kinnitty in the county decider kick-started a remarkable run of success that yielded a record-breaking five championships in succession. As well as this Horan collected a second Leinster medal in 1972 as St Rynagh's narrowly defeated old rivals Rathnure by 5–5 to 2–13.

After a number of years out of the spotlight, St Rynagh's returned to the top table once again in 1981. A defeat of Kinnitty gave Horan his ninth championship medal.

St Rynagh's retained the title in 1982 with Horan securing a remarkable tenth championship medal. He later won a third Leinster medal as St Rynagh's narrowly defeated Buffer's Alley by 1–16 to 2–10.

Horan finished off his club hurling career in 1987 when he captured his eleventh championship medal following a defeat of Seir Kieran.

Inter-county
Horan first came to prominence on the inter-county scene as a dual player with the Offaly minor and under-21 teams.

He made his senior debut in a National Hurling League game against Kilkenny in 1969. The following year he made his first championship appearance in a provincial quarter-final against Laois.

In 1980 Offaly emerged from the doldrums to qualify for only their second provincial decider in fifty years. Reigning All-Ireland champions provided the opposition, however, a remarkable 3–17 to 5–10 victory gave Horan his first Leinster medal. The victory was tinged with sadness for Horan as his father died at home while listening to the match on the radio. Offaly's dream season came to an end with a defeat by eventual champions Galway in the All-Ireland semi-final.

Offaly proved that their success was more than a flash in the pan by reaching the provincial final again in 1981. Horan was captain that year as Offaly defeated Wexford by 3–12 to 2–13. It was Horan's second Leinster medal. This win allowed Offaly to advance to a very first All-Ireland final with reigning champions Galway. After fourteen minutes Pat Carroll scored the opening goal of the game for Offaly, however, neither side built up a strong lead. Straight after the interval goalkeeper Damien Martin was doing great work when he batted out an almost certain Galway goal. With just over twenty minutes left in the game Galway led by six points, however, the team failed to score for the rest of the match. Offaly, on the other hand, ate into this lead. Johnny Flaherty's controversial hand-passed goal with three minutes was the deciding score of the game. At the full-time whistle Offaly were the winners by 2–12 to 0–15. It was a first All-Ireland medal for Horan while he also had the honour of lifting the Liam MacCarthy Cup.

After suffering back-to-back Leinster final defeats to Kilkenny, Offaly triumphed once again in 1984. A 1–15 to 2–11 defeat of Wexford gave Horan a third Leinster medal. Offaly subsequently advanced to the centenary All-Ireland final at Semple Stadium in Thurles. On the day, however, Cork were far too strong for Horan's team. Although far from being a classic game Offaly were defeated by 3–16 to 1–12.

Offaly retained their Leinster title in 1985 with Horan adding a fourth provincial memento to this collection following a 5–15 to 0–17 trouncing of Laois. Galway provided the opposition in the subsequent All-Ireland final and another tense game ensued. Once again it was Offaly's goal-scoring ability that proved crucial. Pat Cleary scored the first of the day after twenty-five minutes of play and got his second less than half a minute after the restart. Joe Dooley had a goal disallowed halfway through the second-half while a long Joe Cooney effort, which seemed to cross the goal line, was not given. P.J. Molloy was Galway's goal scorer, however, the day belonged to Offaly. A 2–11 to 1–12 victory gave Horan his second All-Ireland medal.

Horan retired from inter-county hurling following Offaly's exit from the provincial championship in 1986.

Inter-provincial
Horan has also lined out with Leinster in the inter-provincial series of games and enjoyed much success.

In 1973 he was at full-back as Leinster qualified for the final. A 1–13 to 2–8 defeat of arch-rivals Munster gave Horan a Railway Cup medal. It was the first of three successive final victories over Munster, with Horan playing a key role in all of those finals.

Managerial career

Offaly
In 1990 Horan took over as manager of the Offaly senior hurling team. While the team had won three successive Leinster finals between 1987 and 1989, Offaly had failed to get past the All-Ireland semi-final stage. Under Horan the success continued. A 2–6 to 0–10 defeat of Wexford secured the National Hurling League title for Offaly in 1991. It was their first ever victory in that competition. Success in the championship proved elusive for Horan as Offaly exited the provincial series at an early stage in both 1991 and 1992.

Laois
In 1997 Horan returned to inter-county management when he took charge of the Laois senior hurling team. His three years in charge were without success and he resigned in 2000 when it emerged that a number of high-profile players refused to play in the National Hurling League.

Offaly Under-21
In 2007 Horan made a surprise return to inter-county management when he took charge of the Offaly under-21 hurling team. His first season in charge saw Offaly reach the Leinster final for the first time seven years. Dublin provided the opposition, and went on to record a 2–18 to 3–9 victory.

Horan's under-21 side reached the provincial decider once again in 2008. On this occasion they faced a 2–12 to 2–9 defeat by Kilkenny.

Birr GAA Club
After leaving his position as manager of the Offaly senior hurling team, Horan turned his hand to club management when he took charge of the Birr senior hurling team. Once again success was immediate. In 1994 Birr defeated Seir Kieran to take the county championship title. More success was to follow, as a 3–7 to 2–5 defeat of Oulart-the Ballagh in a replay of the provincial decider secured the Leinster title for Horan's side. The subsequent All-Ireland final pitted Birr against Dunloy A 0–9 apiece score line was the result, however, Birr won the replay at their ease by 3–13 to 2–3.

St Rynagh's Hurling Club
Horan returned to the club scene in 2000 when he took over as manager of his own St Rynagh's Hurling Club. In 2001 he guided the club to the championship final against three-in-a-row hopefuls Birr. While St Rynagh's were given little chance, they made Birr battle all the way. An 0–11 to 0–10 score line gave Birr the title.

Horan resigned as manager in 2003, however, he returned for one more unsuccessful tenure in 2006.

Honours

As a player
St Rynagh's
Leinster Senior Club Hurling Championship (3): 1970, 1973, 1982
Offaly Senior Club Hurling Championship (11): 1968, 1969, 1970, 1972, 1973, 1974 (c), 1975, 1976, 1981 (c), 1982, 1987

Offaly
All-Ireland Senior Hurling Championship (2): 1981 (c), 1985
Leinster Senior Hurling Championship (4): 1980, 1981 (c), 1984, 1985

Leinster
Railway Cup (3): 1973, 1974, 1975

As a manager
Birr
All-Ireland Senior Club Hurling Championship (1): 1995
Leinster Senior Club Hurling Championship (1): 1994
Offaly Senior Club Hurling Championship (1): 1994

Offaly
National Hurling League (1): 1990–91

Individual
All Stars Award (1): 1985
GAA Hall of Fame Inductee: 2017

References

1950 births
Living people
All-Ireland Senior Club Hurling Championship winning managers
Dual players
Irish schoolteachers
St Rynagh's hurlers
St Rynagh's Gaelic footballers
Offaly inter-county hurlers
Offaly Gaelic footballers
Leinster inter-provincial hurlers
All-Ireland Senior Hurling Championship winners
Hurling managers